Vivat ribbons were silk ribbons issued to raise money for the Red Cross in Germany and Austria  during World War I.

Ribbons had printed patriotic messages which celebrated battles and important events, as well as royalty and the military leaders. They were designed by many famous German artists of the period.  Most ribbons had the same size and followed the same design pattern with word "!" ("Long live!") printed on top, followed by unique text and graphic below.  The bottom of the ribbon showed "" ("To the benefit of the Red Cross; Verlag Amsler & Ruthardt; Berlin W8") text, since they were released by the German Red Cross to raise funds for war relief. During World War I 200,000 ribbons were sold  and they become popular collectors items.

Bibliography
 
 
 
 Hans-Christian Pust: Vivatbänder, in: Didier, Christophe (Hg.): 1914–1918 In Papiergewittern. Die Kriegssammlungen der Bibliotheken, Paris: Somogy 2008, p. 204–209.
 Entry Vivat in Meyers Enzyklopädisches Lexikon. Bibliographisches Institut, Lexikonverlag, Mannheim/Wien/Zürich 1975, volume 24, p. 639.

References

German Empire in World War I
Arts in Germany
Ribbon symbolism
Medals of the International Red Cross and Red Crescent Movement
Nationalism
Propaganda art
Propaganda in Germany